The United Energy Group (UEG) is a Chinese oil & gas exploration and production company. The company pursues projects in Pakistan and Indonesia and is looking into further investment options in South East Asia and the Americas.

Corporate affairs
UEG is a Hong Kong listed company but controlled by Zhang Hongwei, a majority shareholder in mainland China, who owns 71.7% of the company.

China
The company undertook a joint venture with the China National Petroleum Company to develop the Liaohe EOR Project in Liaoning, China until it announced termination of the project in 2016.

Pakistan

External links

 UEP Website

References

Oil and gas companies of Hong Kong